The 2005–06 UC Irvine Anteaters men's basketball team represented the University of California, Irvine during the 2005–06 NCAA Division I men's basketball season. The Anteaters were led by 9th year head coach Pat Douglass and played at the Bren Events Center. They were members of the Big West Conference.

Previous season 
The 2004–05 UC Irvine Anteaters men's basketball team finished the season with a record of 16–13 and 8–10 in Big West play.

Roster

Schedule

|-
!colspan=9 style=|Regular Season

|-
!colspan=9 style=| Big West Conference tournament

Source

Awards and honors
Aaron Fitzgerald 
All-Big West First Team
Adam Templeton 
Big West All Freshman Team

References

UC Irvine Anteaters men's basketball seasons
UC Irvine
UC Irvine Anteaters
UC Irvine Anteaters